Reindeer Lake is a lake in western Canada located on the border between north-eastern Saskatchewan and north-western Manitoba, with the majority in Saskatchewan. The name of the lake appears to be a translation of the Algonquian name. It is the 24th largest lake in the world by area, as well as being the second-largest lake in Saskatchewan and the ninth largest in Canada. 8% of the lake lies in Manitoba and 92% of lake in Saskatchewan.

Geography
Reindeer Lake has a heavily indented shoreline and contains numerous small islands. On its eastern shore is the community of Kinoosao, at its northern end Brochet, Manitoba; and at its southern end, Southend, Saskatchewan. It drains mainly to the south, via the Reindeer River and a controlled weir, to the Churchill River and then east to Hudson Bay. Water flow out of the lake is regulated by the Whitesand Dam.

According to local Cree legend, it is also the location of a lake monster.

Development
Several early explorers including David Thompson travelled through the lake. It did not serve a major role in the fur trade as only a few short-lived trading posts were established.  Today road access to the lake is provided by Highway 102 that terminates at Southend, Saskatchewan, and Highway 302.

Fishing
Fishing is an important industry in the area and sport-fishermen are drawn by its clear and deep waters. Trophy-sized pike are common at Reindeer Lake. The lake also supports light commercial fishing.
Fish species include walleye, yellow perch, northern pike, lake trout, Arctic grayling, lake whitefish, cisco, round whitefish, burbot, white sucker and longnose sucker.

Several bays and islands on Reindeer Lake host fishing lodges.

NORAD Tracks Santa
Reindeer Lake was a featured Santa Cam location from the start of the 2002 NORAD Tracks Santa tracking season to the end of the 2011 season when NORAD opted to switch to a regional format the next year instead of the individual profiling of cities they had been doing.

See also
List of lakes of Saskatchewan

References

External links
 Encyclopedia of Saskatchewan
 A brief history of Reindeer Lake

Lakes of Saskatchewan
Lakes of Manitoba
Hudson's Bay Company trading posts
Borders of Saskatchewan
Borders of Manitoba
Glacial lakes of Canada
Glacial lakes of Manitoba